The Potomac River National Wildlife Refuge Complex is a complex of three National Wildlife Refuges in Virginia, located along the Potomac River.

The three refuges are:
Elizabeth Hartwell Mason Neck National Wildlife Refuge
Featherstone National Wildlife Refuge
Occoquan Bay National Wildlife Refuge

The first two are administered jointly for planning, while the third is currently treated separately.

References
Complex homepage

National Wildlife Refuges in Virginia